María Fernanda González Ramirez (born April 25, 1990) is an Olympic and National record-holding backstroke swimmer from Mexico. She swam for Mexico at the 2008 Summer Olympics.

In March 2012, González was the first of Mexico's swimming qualifiers for the 2012 Olympics.  She swam in the 100 and 200 m backstroke.

Career

As of March 2008, González holds the Mexican Records in the long-course (50m) 50, 100 and 200 backstrokes, as well as in the short-course (25m) 100 and 200 backstrokes.

At the 2006 Central American and Caribbean Games, she set the Games Records by winning the 50 and 100 backstroke events (30.61 and 1:04.28). In the 100 back, González also bettered a 20-year-old record set by Costa Rica's Silvia Poll (1:04.43) at the 1986 Games.

References

External links

1990 births
Living people
Mexican female swimmers
Swimmers at the 2008 Summer Olympics
Swimmers at the 2012 Summer Olympics
Swimmers at the 2011 Pan American Games
Olympic swimmers of Mexico
Swimmers from Mexico City
Swimmers at the 2015 Pan American Games
Pan American Games bronze medalists for Mexico
Pan American Games medalists in swimming
Central American and Caribbean Games gold medalists for Mexico
Central American and Caribbean Games silver medalists for Mexico
Central American and Caribbean Games bronze medalists for Mexico
Competitors at the 2006 Central American and Caribbean Games
Competitors at the 2010 Central American and Caribbean Games
Competitors at the 2014 Central American and Caribbean Games
Central American and Caribbean Games medalists in swimming
Female backstroke swimmers
Medalists at the 2011 Pan American Games
21st-century Mexican women